Silvian Dobre (born 4 December 1967) is a Romanian former footballer who played as a midfielder.

Honours
Samsunspor
Balkans Cup: 1993–94

References

1967 births
Living people
Romanian footballers
Association football midfielders
Liga I players
Liga II players
Liga III players
Süper Lig players
FC Sportul Studențesc București players
CS Corvinul Hunedoara players
FC Brașov (1936) players
Samsunspor footballers
Romanian expatriate footballers
Expatriate footballers in Turkey
Expatriate sportspeople in Turkey
Romanian expatriate sportspeople in Turkey
Footballers from Bucharest